Raz and Jargalan County is in North Khorasan province, Iran. The capital of the county is the city of Raz. At the 2006 census, the region's population (as Raz and Jargalan District of Bojnord County) was 55,418 in 12,968 households. The following census in 2011 counted 59,034 people in 14,992 households. At the 2016 census, the county's population was 59,210 in 15,903 households, by which time the district had been separated from the county to become Raz and Jargalan County.

Administrative divisions

The population history and structural changes of Raz and Jargalan County's administrative divisions over three consecutive censuses are shown in the following table. The latest census shows three districts, six rural districts, and one city.

References

Counties of North Khorasan Province